The 1974 NCAA Division I Wrestling Championships were the 44th NCAA Division I Wrestling Championships to be held. Iowa State University in Ames, Iowa hosted the tournament at Hilton Coliseum.

Oklahoma took home the team championship with 69.5 points and two individual champions.

Floyd Hitchcock of Bloomsburg was named the Most Outstanding Wrestler and Jim Woods of Western Illinois received the Gorriaran Award.

Team results

Individual finals

References
1974 NCAA Tournament Results
NCAA Wrestling History

NCAA Division I Wrestling Championship
NCAA
Wrestling competitions in the United States
NCAA Division I Wrestling Championships
NCAA Division I Wrestling Championships
NCAA Division I Wrestling Championships